Ronald Hamilton (born 24 April 1945) is a retired Scottish professional footballer who played in the Scottish League for Kilmarnock, St Mirren and Queen of the South as a centre forward. He is best remembered for his time as player, assistant manager, coach, scout and chairman of Kilmarnock. At the time of his debut as a player for Kilmarnock, Hamilton was the club's youngest ever player and the youngest post-war Scottish League First Division player. As of June 2022, he had served as president of Ardeer Thistle for more than 30 years.

Personal life 
Hamilton attended Kilmarnock Academy. As of 2007, he was working as a chartered accountant.

Career statistics

Honours 
Kilmarnock
Scottish League First Division: 1964–65
St Mirren

 Scottish League Second Division: 1967–68

Individual

 Kilmarnock Hall of Fame

References

External links 

Ronnie Hamilton at killiefc.com

Association football forwards
Kilmarnock F.C. non-playing staff
Kilmarnock F.C. players
Scottish Football League players
Scottish footballers
People educated at Kilmarnock Academy
1945 births
Living people
Footballers from Kilmarnock
St Mirren F.C. players
Queen of the South F.C. players
Scottish accountants